Sir Reginald Henry Cox, 1st Baronet,  (30 December 1865 – 27 March 1922) was an English banker.

Cox was born in Westminster, the second son of Frederick Cox  of Hillingdon House and Mabel Eden. He was educated at Eton. He was Senior Partner of Cox & Co and agent to the British Army. He was created a baronet, of Old Windsor in the County of Berkshire, in the 1921 New Year Honours.

He lived in Old Windsor, Berkshire and was appointed a deputy lieutenant and selected High Sheriff of Berkshire for 1919–20.

In 1890, he married Sybil Weguelin, daughter of MP Thomas Matthias Weguelin. He died at the age of 57 without surviving children and the baronetcy thus became extinct after only just over a year.

References

1865 births
1922 deaths
People from Westminster
People educated at Eton College
English bankers
Baronets in the Baronetage of the United Kingdom
Deputy Lieutenants of Berkshire
High Sheriffs of Berkshire